What About You may refer to:

 "What About You", a song by Billy Preston from his album That's the Way God Planned It
 "What About You", a song by Lala Karmela from her album Stars

See also 
 What About Me (disambiguation)